Pliny Earle Chase (18 August 1820 in Worcester, Massachusetts – 17 December 1886 in Haverford, Pennsylvania) was an American scientist, mathematician, and educator who contributed to the fields of astronomy, electromagnetism, and cryptography, among others.

Biography
He graduated at Harvard in 1839, then taught in Philadelphia and engaged in business for many years, but employed his leisure in physical and philological studies.  In 1863 he was elected a member of the American Antiquarian Society and the American Philosophical Society. In 1864 the Magellanic gold medal of the American Philosophical Society was awarded him for his Numerical Relations of Gravity and Magnetism. The results of other mathematical and physical researches were published from time to time in the Proceedings of the American Philosophical Society, and brought him a worldwide reputation as a man of unusual scientific powers and attainments. In 1871 he became a member of the faculty of Haverford College, Pennsylvania, and for a long time was professor of philosophy and logic. He published Elements of Meteorology (1884).

Family
His brother Thomas Chase was a noted Latin scholar. His mother, Lydia Earle Chase, was the daughter of the famous inventor Pliny Earle. Pliny Chase had two brothers and three sisters. His sister Lucy Chase (1822–1909) was a noted abolitionist, supporter of women's suffrage and the temperance movement, and teacher in contraband camps and freedman schools in the American South. Upon his death, Pliny Chase left a widow, two sons and three daughters.

Notes

References

External links 
 Obituary in the Proceedings of the American Antiquarian Society, Volume 4, April 1887, pp. 316-321
 Elements of Meteorology

1820 births
1886 deaths
Harvard University alumni
Haverford College faculty
Members of the American Antiquarian Society
19th-century American mathematicians
People from Haverford Township, Pennsylvania
Earle family